Howard Lee (Red) Camp (July 1, 1893 – May 8, 1960) was a Major League Baseball outfielder who played in five games for the  New York Yankees. Camp had six hits in 21 at-bats, with one double. He batted left and threw right-handed.

Camp was born in Hopeful, Alabama, and died in Eastaboga, Alabama.

External links

1893 births
1960 deaths
People from Talladega County, Alabama
New York Yankees players
Major League Baseball outfielders
Baseball players from Alabama
Minor league baseball managers
Charleston Sea Gulls players
Newark Bears (IL) players
Toledo Mud Hens players
Dallas Submarines players
Vernon Tigers players
Memphis Chickasaws players
Birmingham Barons players
Nashville Vols players
Reading Keystones players
Charlotte Hornets (baseball) players
People from Eastaboga, Alabama